Linda signaticornis is a species of beetle in the family Cerambycidae. It was described by Bernhard Schwarzer in 1925. It is known from Taiwan.

References

signaticornis
Beetles described in 1925